Audeoudia haltica is a species of snout moth in the genus Audeoudia. It was described by Edward Meyrick in 1933 and is known from Tanzania.

The larvae feed on the fruit of Euphorbia species.

References

Phycitinae
Moths described in 1933
Moths of Africa